Teri Thornton, born Shirley Enid Avery (September 1, 1934 – May 2, 2000) was an American jazz singer.

Thornton first performed in local Detroit clubs in the 1950s. She moved to New York City in the 1960s, where she found work singing for television advertisements, and recorded for several different labels.  Late in the 1960s Thornton faded from public view, and only decades later was discovered to have been singing on various song poem records in Los Angeles on the Preview label as "Teri Summers." She played clubs in New York after moving back there from Los Angeles in 1983, and in the 1990s she fully revived her career. She was a resident of the Actors' Fund Home in Englewood, New Jersey. In 1998, she won the Thelonious Monk Institute of Jazz Vocal Competition in Washington, DC. (Singers Jane Monheit, Tierney Sutton and Roberta Gambarini were runners-up in the same competition.) Thornton signed with Verve, which released I'll Be Easy to Find. That same year, she was diagnosed with bladder cancer and died of the disease in 2000.

Discography
 Devil May Care  (Riverside, 1961) 
 Open Highway (Columbia, 1963)
 Somewhere in the Night (Dauntless, 1963)
 I'll Be Easy to Find (Verve, 1999)

References

1934 births
2000 deaths
American jazz singers
Singers from Michigan
People from Englewood, New Jersey
Riverside Records artists
Verve Records artists
20th-century American singers
Deaths from cancer in New Jersey
Deaths from bladder cancer
Jazz musicians from Michigan